Hugh Thomas may refer to:
 Hugh Thomas (actor) (born 1949), Welsh actor
 Hugh Thomas, Baron Thomas of Swynnerton (1931–2017), British historian and writer
 Hugh Thomas (equestrian) (born 1948), British ex-Olympian and Badminton Horse Trials director and course-designer
 Hugh Thomas (choral conductor), American choral conductor, pianist and educator
 Hugh Thomas (coach), Australian rules football coach
 Hugh Hamshaw Thomas (1885–1962), British paleobotanist
 Hugh Owen Thomas (1834–1891), Welsh surgeon
 Hugh Thomas (priest) (c. 1706–1780), Dean of Ely and Master of Christ's College, Cambridge

See also
 Hugh Evan-Thomas (1862–1928), World War I admiral
 Huw Thomas (1927–2009), Welsh broadcaster, barrister and Liberal politician